Painkillers is the second EP by American alternative rock band Babes in Toyland, released in June 1993. It consists of outtakes from their second studio album, Fontanelle (1992), as well as a 34-minute single-track live recording of the band's April 1992 performance at CBGB in New York City.

Track listing

Personnel
Musicians
Kat Bjellandvocals, guitar
Maureen Hermanbass
Lori Barberodrums, vocals 

Technical
Jack Endinoproduction 
Kat Bjellandproduction 
Lee Ranaldoproduction 
Lori Barberoproduction

Chart performance

References

External links
[ Allmusic: Painkillers]
Discography.com's Painkiller Info Page

1993 EPs
Babes in Toyland (band) EPs
Reprise Records EPs
Albums produced by Jack Endino